"Save Your Love" is a 1990 song by American singer–songwriter Tracie Spencer. This song is the first single from Spencer's second album, Make the Difference which was released in August 1990. The song was written by Kenny Harris and released on July 30, 1990. In this uptempo song, Spencer is expressing her love to someone by letting them know that she'll be "saving my love for you" and is asking that they do the same.

Chart information
"Save Your Love" peaked at number 7 on the Hot R&B/Hip-Hop Songs chart in Billboard magazine, becoming Spencer's first top-10 hit on the chart in late–1990.

Weekly charts

Personnel
 Additional production – Matt Sherrod and Paul Sherrod
 Arranged – Matt Sherrod, Paul Sherrod, & Sir Spence
 Background vocals – Tracie Spencer, The Boys, Tim Townsend, and Crystal Carlisle

References

1990 singles
Tracie Spencer songs
1990 songs
Capitol Records singles